Nguyễn Võ Nghiêm Minh (Vietnam, 1956), known as Minh Nguyen-Vo, is a Vietnamese-American film director.

His films include Mùa len trâu (English title: The Buffalo Boy), for which he won many international awards. He spent 16 years as a physicist at the University of California in Los Angeles before completing cinematography studies at the same institution in 1998.

His latest film, Nước (English title: 2030), a futuristic feature film set in 2030 Vietnam, was selected as the opening night film of the Panorama section of the 64th Berlin International Film Festival.

Awards
New Directors Silver Hugo Award, 40th Chicago International Film Festival (2004)
Grand Prix, Amiens International Film Festival (2004)
Best film, Asian Marine Film Festival (2005)
Best film and nomination for best director, 50th Asia-Pacific Film Festival (2005)
Best director, Cape Town Film Festival, (2005)
Most outstanding film, Vietnamese Entrepreneurs' Cultural Centre (2005)
Best foreign language film, Palm Springs International Film Festival (2006)
Best director, 15th Vietnam Film Festival (2007)

References

External links

1956 births
Vietnamese film directors
American people of Vietnamese descent
University of California, Los Angeles alumni
Living people